Omega is an unincorporated community in White River Township, Hamilton County, Indiana.

History
Omega was known popularly in the 19th century as Dog Town, after a mail carrier complained of the number of dogs there. A post office was established as Omega in 1870, and remained in operation until it was discontinued in 1902.

Geography

References

Unincorporated communities in Hamilton County, Indiana
Unincorporated communities in Indiana
Indianapolis metropolitan area